Government High School, Saheed Nagar(established : 1968) is a government high school located in Bhubaneswar . It is co-ed school . The medium of teaching is Odia . It is located at a central place of Bhubaneswar called Saheed Nagar. Mrs Puspa Rani Praharaj is currently working as the Head Mistress of the School.

History 

School was established in the year 1968 as a private school . Govt of Odisha taken over the school in 1971 . The first Head Master was Mr. Shyam Sundar Patnaik .

Facilities 

The school has 20 teachers and 2 non-teaching staffs apart from the Head Master . School gives equal emphasis to both studies and extra curricular activities. It has got a play ground inside the campus . Scout, NCC, Red Cross wings are available in the school . The other clubs running in the school are Eco Club, Science Club and Culture Club. The school publishes a magazine named as "Saheed" . Students of this school has participated in many state and national competitions and won prizes .

References

Schools in Bhubaneswar
Educational institutions established in 1968
1968 establishments in Orissa